Creedite is a calcium aluminium sulfate fluoro hydroxide mineral with formula: Ca3Al2SO4(F,OH)10·2(H2O). Creedite forms colorless to white to purple monoclinic prismatic crystals. It often occurs as acicular radiating sprays of fine prisms. It is translucent to transparent with indices of refraction of nα = 1.461 nβ = 1.478 nγ = 1.485. It has a Mohs hardness of 3.5 to 4 and a specific gravity of 2.7.

Creedite was first described in 1916 from the Creede Quadrangle in Mineral County, Colorado. It is a product of intense oxidation of ore deposits.

Occurrence

Creedite is a rare hydroxylhalide mineral. Creedite usually forms from the oxidation of fluorite ore deposits. Creedite was named after the location where it was discovered in 1916 in the Colorado Fluorspar Co. Mine at Wagon Wheel Gap, located at Creede Quadrangle, Mineral County, Colorado.

It was later found in other fluorite veins near Tonopah, Nye County, Nevada; in the Grand Reef mine, Graham County, Arizona; in the Darwin district, Inyo County, California. It also occurs in the Potosi and other mines of Santa Eulalia, Chihuahua, Mexico. It is also found in La Paz, Bolivia; Pamir Mountains, Tajikistan and Dzhezkazgan, Kazakhstan.

Geologic association

Creedite typically occurs with low-grade metamorphic rocks on a fluorite – calcite – quartz matrix or on a sulfide-matrix with its oxidized products. Creedite most commonly found in the form of creedite – carbonate – cyanotrichite – woodwardite – spangolite – kaolinite association. The other less common creedite association is creedite – limonite – kaolinite – hemimorphite – smithsonite – hydrozincite – aurichalcite. Creedite also occurs in skarn formation which usually has association with sulfides, spangolite, brochantite, linarite, limonite, cuprite, wad and kaolinite. In general, creedite usually found as two to three millimeters radial aggregates and less commonly as a single prismatic crystals up to one millimeters long.

Structure
Creedite structural composition study was conducted by utilizing 1390 Philips diffractometer with Fe – filtered CoK radiation (λ=1.79021Å), 10–90° 2θ range, peak-height relative intensities. It was concluded that the creedite falls into monoclinic crystal system (2/m) that has space group of C2/c. It was also found that creedite has basal reflections of (2 0 0) and (4 0 0) that are enhanced due to preferred orientation which concur with Michael Fleischer's orientation.

References

Kiselva, I. A.; Ogorodova, L.P.; Mel'Chalkova, L.V.; Getmanskaya, T.I., Enthalpy of Formation of Creedite Ca3Al2F8.25(OH) (1.75)(SO4) Center dot 2H(2) O, Geochemistry International, pp. 1026–1030, OCT 2002.
Frau, F.; Rizzo, R.; Sabelli, C., Creedite from Sardinia, Italy: the first European Occurrence, Neues Jahrbuch Fur Mineralogie-Monashefte, pp. 495–504, NOV 1998.
Giuseppetti, G; Tadini, C., Structure Analysis and refinement of Bolivian Creedite, Ca3Al2F8(OH)2(SO4)*2(H2O), Neues Jahrbuch Fur Mineralogie-Monashefte, pp. 69–78, 1983.
Fleischer, M, Probable Identity of Belyankite With Creedite, U.S. Geological Survey, 1992.
K, Robert B., Creedite: Cresson Mine, Cripple Creek Teller County, Colorado. Rocks & Minerals, pp422–427, OCT 2008.
Foshag, W. F., (1932) Creedite from Nevada: Am. Mineral., 17, 75–77.

External links
Mineral galleries

Calcium minerals
Aluminium minerals
Fluorine minerals
Monoclinic minerals
Minerals in space group 15
Minerals described in 1916